Hydeout Productions 1st Collection is a compilation album, the first of two released by Nujabes' Hydeout Productions label. It showcases Nujabes' style of combining the music genres of hip hop and jazz, and features artists Funky DL, Apani B, Substantial, Shing02, L-Universe, Pase Rock, Five Deez, and Cise Starr.

Hydeout Productions 1st Collection received critical praise.

Track listing

References

External links
 

Albums produced by Nujabes
Hip hop compilation albums
Nujabes albums
2003 compilation albums